Chejerla may refer to two places in Andhra Pradesh, India:

Chejerla, Guntur district
Chejerla, Nellore district